Time of My Life or The Time of My Life may refer to:

Music

Albums 
 Time of My Life (3 Doors Down album), 2011
 Time of My Life (Nathan Carter album), 2011
 Time of My Life (George Fox album), 1995
 Time of My Life (Ronan Keating album), 2016

Songs
 "Time of My Life" (George Fox song), 1995
 "The Time of My Life" (David Cook song), a 2008 song by David Cook
 "(I've Had) The Time of My Life", a 1987 song by Bill Medley and Jennifer Warnes, used as the theme song for the film Dirty Dancing
 "Time of My Life", a 2016 song by The Afters from the album Live On Forever
 "Time of My Life", a 2010 song by Patrick Wolf from the album Lupercalia
 "Time of My Life", a 2020 song by The Rubens

Others
 Time of My Life (play), a 1992 play by Alan Ayckbourn
 Time of My Life (Philippine TV series), a 2011 Philippine drama
 Time of My Life (Australian TV series), a 2013 Australian documentary series
 Time of My Life (film), a 2012 Belgian film
 "The Time of My Life" (Johnny Bravo), a 2004 episode of Johnny Bravo

See also 
 Time of Your Life (disambiguation)
 Time of Our Lives (disambiguation)